Ring of Honor Wrestling, also known as ROH Honor Club TV, and often shortened as ROH Wrestling TV or ROH TV, is an American professional wrestling television series produced by Ring of Honor (ROH). The series features professional wrestlers competing in matches and conducting interviews. Combined, these elements create and further the storylines of the promotion.

The pilot episode was taped on February 28, 2009, and the series premiered on March 21, 2009, airing weekly on HDNet in the United States. The series' 100th and final HDNet episode aired on April 4, 2011. The series would return under the same title, airing on television stations owned by the Sinclair Broadcast Group on September 24, 2011; such stations being affiliates of The CW and MyNetworkTV. Following the acquisition of Ring of Honor from Sinclair by All Elite Wrestling president and co-founder Tony Khan in March 2022, the show eventually ceased broadcasting on Sinclair's stations; the final episode aired on April 15, 2022. Khan later announced in December 2022 that ROH's weekly televised program will be aired on the relaunched Honor Club streaming platform. The series returned on March 2, 2023.

Production 
Ring of Honor (ROH) first announced its partnership with HDNet in an article posted to its website on January 26, 2009. The article stated that HDNet would air a weekly ROH television series titled Ring of Honor Wrestling. They subsequently announced their first television tapings would take place at The Arena in Philadelphia, Pennsylvania. Ring of Honor Wrestling began airing weekly on March 21, 2009, on HDNet. On July 1, 2009, it was reported that Ring of Honor had canceled television tapings scheduled for July 17 and 18; it was reported to be a decision made by HDNet, and not Ring of Honor. On July 27, 2009, ROH announced that the show would be moving to Monday nights beginning on August 17, with a repeat airing later that night. On February 11, 2010, it was announced that Ring of Honor Wrestling would be airing in Italy on Dahlia TV. On January 11, 2011, Ring of Honor announced the end of its television series, after the completion of the promotion's two–year contract with HDNet. The show's final tapings took place on January 21 and 22, with the final episode airing on April 4, 2011.

On May 21, 2011, the Sinclair Broadcast Group announced that they had purchased ROH, with Cary Silkin remaining with the company in an executive role. Ring of Honor Wrestling began airing in September 2011 over Sinclair stations, mainly in weekend primetime on their CW and MyNetworkTV stations. 

On September 9, 2014, ROH announced that Ring of Honor Wrestling would begin being syndicated to stations in non-Sinclair markets, with Gannett Company-owned WATL in Atlanta becoming the first non-Sinclair station to air Ring of Honor Wrestling on September 13, 2014.

On May 27, 2015, ROH announced a 26-week television deal with Destination America, beginning on June 3. The program originally aired twice on Wednesdays; first at 8pm and then a replay at 11pm. However, after struggling to gain viewers, Ring of Honor Wrestling lost their primetime slot in late July and was reduced to a single airing at 11pm. The final episode on Destination America aired on November 25, 2015. 

On December 2, 2015, Ring of Honor Wrestling debuted on the Sinclair-owned Comet. 

On July 9, 2017, Ring of Honor Wrestling was moved to Charge!. It was also announced that the show would also be streamed through FITE TV, a mobile app that allows streaming through Wi-Fi to a smart TV or a set-top box such as Roku or Chromecast.

Following Sinclair's purchase of the Fox Sports Networks (which were divested by The Walt Disney Company following its acquisition of key assets from 21st Century Fox), Ring of Honor Wrestling began airing on the newly acquired RSN's in November 2019. This brought ROH TV availability in several large markets where Sinclair lacked an over-the-air station.

The show's final episode on Sinclair stations aired on the weekend of April 15, 2022. In an interview with Busted Open following his purchase of the company, Tony Khan announced plans to relaunch the weekly series. On December 10, 2022,  after Final Battle, Khan announced that the program would relaunch and be aired on ROH's streaming service Honor Club, beginning in 2023.

On January 26, 2023, a tribute episode to Jay Briscoe was aired. On February 25 and 26, the first tapings of the relaunched program were held at Universal Studios Soundstage 21 in Orlando, Florida, making it the new home venue of ROH and the same venue where AEW Dark episodes are taped. The series returned with a new season on March 2, 2023.

Episode format
An episode typically features matches as well as interviews from the wrestlers regarding their upcoming matches or current storylines. The show typically ends after the main event (the final match on an episode) and goes to a closing graphic.

Beginning in August 2019, the show's format was changed to feature highlights of recent events, with Ian Riccaboni and Quinn McKay hosting from backstage. The show featured one full-length main event match, with the color commentary during the matches themselves varying as Riccaboni is paired with a variety of partners. It was speculated that this revamp was done in order to drive growth for Honor Club, where the promotion had begun to stream its television tapings live.

Upon Ring of Honor's return to promoting events following the 2020 COVID-19 pandemic hiatus, the series format was revamped beginning on the September 12, 2020 episode.

During the promotion's hiatus after Final Battle in December 2021, the show was revamped to focus on archival footage, "Best of" specials, and highlights from recent events.

Filming locations
All but six episodes of the HDNet run were taped at The Arena in Philadelphia, Pennsylvania. The Arena is frequently used as a professional wrestling venue, and is known prominently for formerly hosting many Extreme Championship Wrestling events.

ROH held television tapings at the Davis Arena in Louisville, Kentucky on December 9 and 10 in 2010.

Beginning in August 2020, after a hiatus due to the COVID-19 pandemic, ROH resumed television tapings from the Chesapeake Employers Insurance Arena (formerly known as the UMBC Event Center) in Maryland.

In February 2023, tapings of the relaunched program began at Universal Studios in Orlando, Florida, ROH's new home venue.

Special episodes

Roster

The wrestlers featured on Ring of Honor Wrestling take part in scripted feuds and storylines. Wrestlers are portrayed as either villains or heroes in the scripted events that build tension and culminate in a wrestling match.

Commentators

Broadcast history

See also

List of professional wrestling television series

References

External links

FITE TV channel

American professional wrestling television series
2010s American television series
2020s American television series
2022 American television series endings
2009 in professional wrestling
2009 American television series debuts
Ring of Honor shows
HDNet original programming
Destination America original programming